Chris Eldridge is an American guitarist and singer. He is a member of Punch Brothers and frequently performs in a duo with fellow guitarist Julian Lage. He is also the guitarist in the house band on Live From Here. He was a founding member of the bluegrass band The Infamous Stringdusters. His father is noted banjoist Ben Eldridge of the Seldom Scene.

Biography
Although initially drawn to electric guitar, Eldridge began developing an acoustic career by his mid-teens, largely due to his father, a founding member of the seminal bluegrass group The Seldom Scene. Eldridge later studied at Oberlin Conservatory, where he studied with legendary guitarist Tony Rice. After graduating, he joined the Seldom Scene with whom he received a Grammy nomination in 2007. In 2005 he founded a critically acclaimed bluegrass group, The Infamous Stringdusters. At the 2007 International Bluegrass Music Association awards Eldridge and his Stringdusters bandmates won Emerging artist of the Year, Song of the Year, and Album of the Year for their debut album, Fork in the Road. Meanwhile, in 2005 he had caught the attention of mandolinist Chris Thile, who enlisted him, along with banjoist Noam Pikelny, violinist Gabe Witcher, and bassist Greg Garrison to start working on an ambitious side project. Soon after they decided to focus all of their collective energies into a band and Punch Brothers was formed.

In 2019, he won the Instrumentalist of the Year award at the Americana Music Honors & Awards.

Discography

Punch Brothers

Julian Lage & Chris Eldridge

The Infamous Stringdusters

Seldom Scene

References

External links
 Chris Eldridge on Myspace
 Punch Brothers Official Website
 Punch Brothers on Myspace

Year of birth missing (living people)
Living people
Guitarists from Virginia
American male guitarists
Punch Brothers members
Oberlin Jazz Ensemble members